Pterostylis plumosa, commonly known as the bearded greenhood or plumed greenhood is a species of orchid in the family Orchidaceae which is endemic to south-eastern Australia and possibly New Zealand. Its labellum or lip is long and thin, bordered with golden hairs, giving it the name "bearded".

Description
The flowers appear from August to November.

Taxonomy and naming
Pterostylis plumosa was first described in 1969 by Leo Cady in "Australian Plants" (published by the Australian Native Plants Society), from a specimen collected "on the road to Abercrombie Caves". The specific epithet plumosus is a Latin word meaning "feathered".

Distribution and habitat
The bearded greenhood occurs in New South Wales, Victoria, South Australia and Tasmania. It is also thought to occur in New Zealand. It is an uncommon species, growing in "heathy woodland [in] semi shade".

References

plumosa
Endemic orchids of Australia
Orchids of New South Wales
Orchids of Victoria (Australia)
Orchids of South Australia
Orchids of Tasmania
Orchids of New Zealand
Plants described in 1969